"Please Excuse My Hands" is the second single from Plies's second album, Definition of Real. It features Jamie Foxx and The-Dream.

Music video
The video was released on July 23, 2008. It premiered as the "New Joint of the Day" on BET's 106 & Park. The video can now be seen on MySpace and YouTube.
The video is about a man expressing how when he is alone with his lover, his hands have a mind of their own, and he does not intend disrespect to her.

Charts

Weekly charts

Year-end charts

References

2008 singles
Plies (rapper) songs
The-Dream songs
Jamie Foxx songs
Song recordings produced by DJ Frank E
Songs written by DJ Frank E
Songs written by Plies (rapper)
Songs written by Oliver Goldstein
2008 songs
Songs written by Darrell "Delite" Allamby